The Royal Order of Jesters is a male fraternal organization, allowing only Shriners in good standing to join. Admission is by invitation only.

Formation 
The original meeting resulting in the formation was held on February 20, 1911, by Shriners in the Captain’s office of the S.S. Wilhelmina on a pilgrimage to Aloha Temple, Hawaii. Noble A.M. Ellison of San Francisco, California, was responsible and the original cast included a Director and thirteen members. It was organized June 25, 1917, at an informal meeting.

About the organization 
The official website for the Royal Order of Jesters describes itself as the following: "Whereas most  Masonic bodies are dedicated to charity, The Royal Order of Jesters is a fun 'degree', with absolutely no serious intent. The motto, 'Mirth is King', is sufficient to give voice to the purpose of the organization. The Royal Order of Jesters feel that there are times, after our hard work and dedication to family and mankind when everyone should remember to laugh and appreciate the good work one has done". The icon of the Order is the Billiken.

The order is very anti-publicity. For example, a website made by one of its members was removed after the intervention of the National Court of the Order. The primary reason behind this was the desire of the Board to minimize the public exposure or public access to Jester information.

Membership
Local "courts" are limited to thirteen initiates yearly and membership is by invitation only. In fact, asking to join will almost certainly result in the individual never being accepted.

Museum 
The Royal Order of Jesters owns a museum in Indiana. On display are items relating to the Order and some items related to William Shakespeare and other historical people who focused on humor in their works.

Prostitution scandal 
In 2008, four public officials from Western New York, including a State Supreme Court Justice, two retired police officers and a law clerk,  were convicted of human trafficking for transporting a prostitute for the Royal Order of Jesters. According to federal prosecutors, the Jesters frequently employed strippers and prostitutes at their parties, with some of the prostitutes being illegally transported over state lines for Jesters events. The FBI has investigated these cases.

References

External links
Organizations established in 1911
Shriners
Comedy troupes
Archived copy